Iqbal Muhammad Ali Khan (1 January 1958 – 19 April 2022) was a Pakistani politician who was a member of the National Assembly of Pakistan from August 2018 until his death. He had previously been a member of the National Assembly from 2002 to May 2018.

Early life
Khan was born on 1 January 1958.

Political career
Khan was elected to the National Assembly of Pakistan as a candidate of Muttahida Qaumi Movement (MQM) from Constituency NA-256 (Karachi-XVIII) in 2002 Pakistani general election. He received 39,196 votes and defeated Muhammad Hasim Siddiqui, a candidate of Muttahida Majlis-e-Amal (MMA).

He was re-elected to the National Assembly as a candidate of MQM from Constituency NA-256 (Karachi-XVIII) in 2008 Pakistani general election. He received 123,491 votes and defeated Mirza Maqbool Ahmed, a candidate of Pakistan Peoples Party (PPP).

He was re-elected to the National Assembly as a candidate of MQM from Constituency NA-256 (Karachi-XVIII) in 2013 Pakistani general election. He received 151,788 votes and defeated Muhammad Zubair Khan, a candidate of Pakistan Tehreek-e-Insaf (PTI).

He was re-elected to the National Assembly as a candidate of MQM from Constituency NA-240 (Korangi Karachi-II) in 2018 Pakistani general election.

References

1958 births
2022 deaths
Muhajir people
Muttahida Qaumi Movement politicians
Pakistani MNAs 2013–2018
Politicians from Karachi
Muttahida Qaumi Movement MNAs
Pakistani MNAs 2008–2013
Pakistani MNAs 2002–2007
Pakistani MNAs 2018–2023